Lisa Mispley Fortier (born April 5, 1981) is an American basketball coach, currently the head coach of the women's basketball team at Gonzaga University.

Early life and education
Fortier, born Lisa Mispley, is the oldest of three children to Bill and Tami Mispley. Fortier played basketball at Placer High School before playing at both Butte Community College and California State University, Monterey Bay. At Cal State, she earned honorable mention All Cal-Pac Conference honors as a junior and was named to the NAIA Academic All-America list in 2003. She graduated Magna Cum Laude from Cal State, Monterey Bay, in 2004 with a B.A. in human communication. As a junior in 2002–03, Fortier averaged 12.1 points,. 4.1 rebounds, and 2.6 assists. As a senior in 2003–04, Fortier averaged 9.1 points, 3.7 rebounds, and 3.0 assists

Coaching career
After two years as director of operations at Gonzaga, where she earned her master's degree in Sport and Athletic Administration in 2006, Fortier was an assistant coach at Northern Colorado in the 2006–07 season, then an assistant at Gonzaga from 2007 to 2014.

On April 14, 2014, Fortier was hired as Gonzaga women's basketball head coach, succeeding Kelly Graves, who accepted the head coaching position for Oregon women's basketball the week before. Prior to becoming head coach, she was director of basketball operations for the Zags from 2004 to 2006 and assistant coach from 2007 to 2014, where she focused on the team's defense.

2014–2015 season
Fortier picked up her first win as a head coach with a 75–65 over the Dayton Flyers women's basketball team at the Kennel on November 16, 2014. The biggest highlight in non-conference was the Eastern Washington game at Reese Court on December 3, 2014, where Elle Tinkle (daughter of current Oregon State Beavers men's basketball coach Wayne Tinkle) shot the game winning jumper as time expired, where the Zags escaped with a 61–60 win. The Zags finished non-conference play with a 7–4 record.

Fortier picked up her first conference win as a head coach with a 78–62 over Jeff Judkins' BYU Cougars women's basketball team at the McCarthey Athletic Center|Kennel on December 27, 2014. The biggest conference game came against the San Francisco Dons on February 7, 2015 at the Kennel, where the Zags won 91–84 in a 4-overtime thriller. The Zags clinched their 11th consecutive WCC regular-season crown on February 19, 2015 with an 80–72 win over Paul Thomas' Saint Mary's Gaels. It also marked the first regular-season crown under Fortier's head coaching tenure. Gonzaga finished West Coast Conference regular-season play with a 16–2 record with losses against Pacific at home and San Diego on the road.

In the year-end conference tournament, the Zags defeated the Loyola Marymount Lions 70–50 before losing to the Brigham Young Cougars 61–55. It was the Zags first non-appearance in the WCC Tournament Final game since the 2006 season.  
However, Gonzaga still received an #11 seed in the Spokane region, the second at-large bid in school history and the third in West Coast Conference play.

In the NCAA tournament, Fortier led the Zags to an 82–69 first round win over the George Washington Colonials and a 76–64 second round win over the Oregon State Beavers. Both the first and second-round games were held at the Gill Coliseum in Corvallis. In the next game, the Zags led the Tennessee Volunteers 57–40 before Tennessee went on a 23–6 run to end regulation and force the game into overtime. The Zags season came to an end with a 73–69 overtime defeat to the Volunteers, in front of mostly Zags fans at the Spokane Arena.

On April 6, 2015, it was announced that she was named the Maggie Dixon Award Rookie Coach of the Year.

2015–2016 season
On June 18, 2015, the WBCA announced that Fortier would serve as part of the Board of Directors for the West region.

Fortier's Zags finished non-conference play with an 8–4 record. Their most significant non-conference game was against Wyoming, where the Zags won 61–57 in overtime. The Zags finished 10–8 in West Coast Conference play, finishing fifth place, ending Gonzaga's 11 consecutive West Coast Conference regular season titles, where the BYU Cougars women's basketball team won the outright title. Gonzaga earned its biggest conference win against #22 BYU in front of a sold-out crowd of 6,000 at the McCarthey Athletic Center, where the Zags outscored BYU 33–13 in the fourth quarter to defeat the WCC regular season champs 73–55 on "Senior Day". In the WCC tournament, the Zags lost to the Santa Clara Broncos 59–58, their earliest tournament exit since the 2005–06 season.

The Zags received an at-large bid for the WNIT, their first since the 2007–08 season. They hosted the UC-Riverside Highlanders; the Big West regular season champs at the McCarthey Athletic Center on March 17, with the Zags defeating the Highlanders 88–54. The Zags next hosted the Utah Utes, losing to the Utes 92–77 to end their season at 19–14. The Zags finished one game shy of playing against their former coach, Kelly Graves and his Oregon Ducks, when his Ducks won 84–59 on the same night the Zags lost to the Utes.

2016–2017 season
The Zags finished non-conference play for the 2016–17 season with a 9–2 record, including upset victories over #11 ranked Stanford at their homecourt on November 18 and over Northwestern at the McCarthey Athletic Center on December 19. The Zags started the WCC conference schedule with losses to Pepperdine in Malibu and Pacific at home.

After losing their first two conference games, the Zags finished conference play winning 14 of the last 16 games, and they were crowned with the WCC regular season title by defeating the San Diego Toreros 62–57 on "Senior Night" in front of a sellout crowd of 6,000 at McCarthey Athletic Center. This marked the Zags' 12th regular season title and the second title in the Fortier era.

The Zags were rewarded with the #1 seed in the WCC tournament and they responded by defeating the 9th seeded Pacific Tigers 91–59 on March 3, the 4th seeded San Francisco Dons 77–46 on March 6, and the 3rd seeded Saint Mary's Gaels 86–75 to win their 7th WCC tournament title in program history and the first tournament title under Fortier. After winning the WCC tournament, the Zags were selected as an #11 seed to face Sherri Coale's Oklahoma Sooners at the Hec Edmundson Pavilion. This marked the ninth NCAA tournament appearance for the Zags and the second under Fortier. The Zags season ended with a 75–62 loss to the Oklahoma Sooners to finish their season with a 26–7 record.

2017–2018 season
The Zags began their season with a 7–4 non-conference record. They finished regular season conference play with a 17–1 record, with the lone loss against St. Mary's at home. The Zags clinched their 13th WCC regular season title and the third under Fortier in the process.

The Zags won their 8th WCC tournament title and their second under Fortier with wins over Pepperdine, San Francisco, and San Diego. They were selected as the 13th seed in the Lexington region, and slated to face the 4th seeded Stanford Cardinal at Maples Pavilion. This marked the tenth NCAA tournament appearance for the Zags and the third under Fortier. The Zags' season ended with an 82–68 loss against Stanford to finish their season with a 27–6 record.

2018–2019 season
The Zags finished nonconference play with an 11–1 record with the lone loss coming against then #1 ranked Notre Dame at the Vancouver Showcase Thanksgiving Day. The biggest win in nonconference came against then #8 ranked Stanford Cardinals, where the Zags upset the Cardinals 79–73 at the Kennel on December 2.  The Zags finished conference play with a 16–2 record, with both losses coming against BYU, both at Marriott Center on January 17 and the Kennel on February 16.  The Zags clinched their 14th regular season WCC title and the fourth under Fortier.  The Zags started off WCC Tournament play with a 78–77 win over St. Mary's on a game winning shot by Zykera Rice at the buzzer and losing Laura Stockton and Jill Townsend to injuries in the game.  The Zags lost the championship game to the BYU Cougars 82–68.  However, the Zags received an at-large bid in the Albany, New York region, where they were selected as the #5 seed and played against Arkansas-Little Rock in the first round. This marked the eleventh NCAA tournament appearance for the Zags and the fourth under Fortier. The Zags defeated the Arkansas-Little Rock Trojans 68–51 on March 23 at Gill Coliseum in Corvallis, Oregon. It was their first NCAA tournament victory since the 2014–15 season.  The Zags faced the Oregon State Beavers in the 2nd round and their season ended with a 76–70 loss to the Beavers to finish the season with a 29–5 record.

USA Basketball assistant coach
In May 2019, Fortier was named one of the four assistant coaches for 2019 USA Basketball Junior National Team trials.

2019–2020 season
The Zags finished non-conference for the second year in a row with a 11–1 record, including winning the Gulf Coast Showcase tournament Thanksgiving weekend, and defeating #20 Missouri State on December 20. The lone loss came on November 17 at then #3 Stanford in overtime.  The Zags finished conference play with a 17–1 record, with the lone loss coming on February 8 at Saint Mary's, ending the Zags 21-games win streak, which was the longest in NCAA women's basketball at the time.  The Zags clinched their 15th regular season WCC title and the fifth under Fortier.  The 28–2 record is the best start in Gonzaga women's basketball history.  The Zags lost to the Portland Pilots 70–69 on March 9 in the semifinals of the WCC tournament at the Orleans Arena in Las Vegas after leading 29–9 towards the end of the first quarter.  On March 12, it was announced that the Lady Zags basketball season abruptly comes to an end, due to the coronavirus issue and the cancellation of postseason play, including NCAA basketball tournaments.  The Lady Zags finished the season with a 28–3 record.

2020–2021 season
The Zags finished non-conference play with a 5–2 record, with wins over the South Dakota Coyotes, Wyoming Cowgirls, Montana Grizzlies, Eastern Michigan Eagles, and North Alabama Lions, along with a near upset of then #1 ranked South Carolina Gamecocks, only losing to them by 7 and the South Dakota State Jackrabbits by 3.  The Zags finished conference play with a 16–1 record, with the lone loss coming on February 18 at BYU.  The Zags clinched their 16th regular season WCC title and the sixth under Fortier.  The Zags defeated the Santa Clara Broncos 72–62 on March 8 and defeated the BYU Cougars 43–42 on a game-winning jump shot by Jill Townsend as time expired on March 9.  It was the Zags' 9th WCC tournament title and their third under Fortier.  The Zags were selected as the 5th seed, as they faced the 12th seed Belmont Bruins at Strahan Coliseum in San Marcos, Texas. The Zags' season came to an end with a 64–59 defeat to the Belmont Bruins, as they ended their season with a 23–4 record.

2021–2022 season
The Zags finished nonconference play with a 9–4 record with three of the four losses decided by 4 points or less.  The Zags finished conference play in second place in the WCC with a 15–2 record, with both losses coming against the BYU Cougars at home and at the Marriott Center.  The Zags defeated the San Francisco Dons 69–55 on March 7 and the Zags upset #15 BYU Cougars 71–59 on March 8 to clinch their 10th tournament title and the 4th under Fortier.  The Zags were selected as the 9th seed in the Wichita region, where they defeated the Nebraska Cornhuskers 68–55 on March 18 at the KFC Yum! Center in Louisville to go to 27–6 on the season.  The Zags faced the Louisville Cardinals on March 20. The Zags lost to the Cardinals 68–59. The Zags finished their season with a 27–7 record.

2022–2023 season
The Zags finished nonconference play with a 10–2 record, including the biggest upset in program history defeating the #6 Louisville Cardinals, but losing to Marquette in the Bahamas and at Stanford. 
The Zags finished WCC play with a 17-1 record, with the lone loss coming at Santa Clara on February 2.  The Zags won their 18th regular season conference title overall. The Zags announced that they are going to have Kayleigh and Kaylynne Troung, Eliza Hollingsworth, and Brynna Maxwell back for the 2023-24 season during the pregame festivities against St. Mary's.  The Zags defeated the BYU Cougars 79-64 on March 6 and got ended up losing to Portland 64-60 on March 7 in the WCC Tournament.  The Zags were selected as the 9th seeded in the Seattle region 4, where they faced the 8th seeded Mississippi Rebels.  The Zags ended their season at 28-5 with a 71-48 loss to Ole Miss at Stanford.

Personal life
Fortier is married to Craig Fortier, whom she met when they both attended Placer High School and Cal State Monterey Bay.
 Craig was formerly the associate head coach for Jim Hayford's Whitworth Pirates and Eastern Washington Eagles men's basketball teams before being hired as an assistant to his wife at Gonzaga. They have two sons and a daughter.

Milestones
As Gonzaga head coach
100th career win/100th win at Gonzaga- November 11, 2018 at Eastern Washington University
100th WCC win as head coach- January 30, 2021 at St. Mary's
200th career win/200th win at Gonzaga- February 21, 2022 vs. Santa Clara

Notable players under Fortier as assistant coach and head coach
Jill Barta- Gonzaga women's basketball player (2015–2018). Left program to pursue teaching or professional basketball career.
Vivian Frieson- Gonzaga women's basketball player (2007-2010). First ever Zags women's basketball player to be drafted in the WNBA draft (3rd round, 7th pick).
Heather Bowman- Gonzaga women's basketball all-time leading scorer (2007–2010). Inducted into the WCC Hall of Fame in 2020 for women's basketball.
Katelan Redmon- Gonzaga women's basketball player (2009-2012).
Laura Stockton- Gonzaga women's basketball player (2015–2019). Daughter of NBA Hall of Famer John Stockton.
Elle Tinkle- Gonzaga women's basketball player (2012-2017). Daughter of Oregon State Beavers men's basketball coach Wayne Tinkle.
Courtney Vandersloot- Gonzaga women's basketball player (2007–2011). Gonzaga women's basketball all-time assists leader and second-all-time leading scorer. Highest WNBA draft pick in team history (first round, 3rd pick).  Formerly played for the Chicago Sky from 2011-2022. Now currently playing for the New York Liberty, as of 2023 season.

Awards and honors
WCC Co-Coach of the Year- 1 time (2015) – She was one of three coaches selected for the honor, along with St. Mary's Gaels women's basketball coach Paul Thomas and Pacific Tiger women's basketball coach Lynne Roberts.
Maggie Dixon Award Rookie Coach of the Year (2015)
WCC Coach of the Year- 4 times (2017, 2018, 2019, & 2023) 
Hall of Fame
-Placer High School- inducted in 2020 
-Cal State Monterey Bay- inducted in 2020 
-Butte College- inducted in 2022

Head coaching record

References

1981 births
Living people
American women's basketball coaches
California State University, Monterey Bay alumni
Gonzaga Bulldogs women's basketball coaches
Junior college women's basketball players in the United States